André Aciman (born 2 January 1951) is an Italian-American writer. Born and raised in Alexandria, Egypt, he is currently a distinguished professor at the Graduate Center of City University of New York, where he teaches the history of literary theory and the works of Marcel Proust. Aciman previously taught creative writing at New York University and French literature at Princeton and Bard College.

In 2009, he was Visiting Distinguished Writer at Wesleyan University.

He is the author of several novels, including Call Me by Your Name (winner, in the Gay Fiction category, of the 2007 Lambda Literary Award and made into a film) and a 1995 memoir, Out of Egypt, which won a Whiting Award. Although best known for Call Me by Your Name, Aciman stated in an interview in 2019 that his best book is the novel Eight White Nights.

Early life and education

Aciman was born in Alexandria, Egypt, the son of Regine and Henri N. Aciman, who owned a knitting factory. His mother was deaf. Aciman was raised in a French-speaking home where family members spoke Italian, Greek, Ladino, and Arabic.

His parents were Sephardic Jews, of Turkish and Italian origin, from families that had settled in Alexandria in 1905 (Turkish surname: Acıman). As members of one of the Mutamassirun ("foreign") communities, his family members were unable to become Egyptian citizens. As a child, Aciman mistakenly believed that he was a French citizen. He attended British schools in Egypt. His family was spared from the 1956–57 exodus and expulsions from Egypt. However, increased tensions with Israel under President Gamal Abdel Nasser put Jews in a precarious position and his family left Egypt nine years later in 1965.

After his father purchased Italian citizenship for the family, Aciman moved with his mother and brother as refugees to Rome while his father moved to Paris. They moved to New York City in 1968. He earned a B.A. in English and Comparative Literature from Lehman College in 1973, and an M.A. and PhD in Comparative Literature from Harvard University in 1988.

Out of Egypt
Aciman's 1996 memoir Out of Egypt, about Alexandria before the 1956 expulsions from Egypt, was reviewed widely. In The New York Times, Michiko Kakutani described the book as a "remarkable memoir...that leaves the reader with a mesmerizing portrait of a now vanished world." She compared his work with that of Lawrence Durrell and noted, "There are some wonderfully vivid scenes here, as strange and marvelous as something in García Márquez

Personal life 
Aciman is married to Susan Wiviott. They have three sons, Alexander and twins Philip and Michael. His wife, a Wisconsin alumna and Harvard Law graduate, is the CEO of the Bridge, Inc., a New York City-based NPO that offers rehabilitative services. She is also a board director of Kadmon Holdings, Inc., and formerly worked as Chief Program Officer of Palladia and Deputy Executive Vice President of JBFCS.

Awards
 1995 Whiting Award
 2007 Lambda Literary Award

Bibliography

Novels
Call Me by Your Name (2007)
Eight White Nights (2010)
Harvard Square (2013)
Enigma Variations (2017)
Find Me (2019)

Short fiction
"Cat's Cradle". The New Yorker. November 1997.

Non-fiction
Out of Egypt (memoir) (1995)
Letters of Transit: Reflections on Exile, Identity, Language, and Loss (editor/contributor) (1999)
False Papers: Essays on Exile and Memory (2000)
Entrez: Signs of France (with Steven Rothfeld) (2001)
The Proust Project (editor) (2004)
The light of New York (with Jean-Michel Berts) (2007)
Alibis: Essays on Elsewhere (2011)
Homo Irrealis: Essays (2021)

Selected articles

"Reflections of an Uncertain Jew". The Threepenny Review. 81. Spring 2000.
"The Exodus Obama Forgot to Mention". Opinion. The New York Times. 8 June 2009.
"Are You Listening? Conversations with my deaf mother". Personal History. The New Yorker. 17 March 2014.
"W. G. Sebald and the Emigrants". The New Yorker. 25 August 2016.
"André Aciman Would Like to Demote Virginia Woolf From the Canon". By the Book. The New York Times. 31 October 2019.

References

Further reading

External links

An Interview with Andre Aciman, bookslut.com 

Profile of André Aciman profile, The Whiting Foundation website; accessed 8 March 2018.

1951 births
20th-century American male writers
21st-century American male writers
American essayists
American literary critics
American male essayists
American male novelists
American memoirists
American people of Italian-Jewish descent
American people of Turkish-Jewish descent
Bard College faculty
City University of New York faculty
Egyptian emigrants to the United States
Graduate Center, CUNY faculty
Harvard Graduate School of Arts and Sciences alumni
Jewish American academics
Jewish American writers
Lambda Literary Award for Gay Fiction winners
Lehman College alumni
Living people
New York University faculty
Novelists from Connecticut
Novelists from New Jersey
Novelists from New York (state)
Writers from Alexandria
Princeton University faculty
The New Yorker people
Wesleyan University faculty
Yeshiva University faculty
21st-century American Jews